Kero! Kero! Kero! is the second studio album by Japanese a girl group eX-Girl, released on the PARANOIZ label in Japan (PAR-50020), and by KIKI Poo Records in the US. "Kero" is the sound a frog makes in the Japanese language , of. "ribbit" in English.

The line-up consisted of Chihiro, Kirilo and Fuzuki, and the album was produced by Hoppy Kamiyama.

Track listing
 "Disco 3000" (Lyrics: Chihiro / Music: eX-Girl, Hoppy Kamiyama) – 6:43.
 "PUYO" (Lyrics: Kirilo / Music: eX-Girl, Kamiyama) – 2:47.
 "The Revenge of Kero Kero" (Lyrics: Fuzuki / Music: eX-Girl, Kamiyama) – 6:00.
 "Tofu Song" (Lyrics: Chihiro / Music: eX-Girl) – 2:01.
 "HAO☆HAO" (Lyrics: Fuzuki / Music: eX-Girl, Kamiyama) – 3:50.
 "Dazzle" (Lyrics: Kirilo / Music: eX-Girl) – 4:59.
 "Chin Chiku Linn Part II" (Music: eX-Girl, Kamiyama) – 0:48.
 "Spaceman, Melon" (Lyrics: eX-Girl / Music: eX-Girl, Kamiyama) – 4:02.
 "Space Mushroom" (Lyrics: eX-Girl, Kamiyama / Music: eX-Girl, Kamiyama) – 13:21.

Personnel
 Chihiro – vocals, electric guitar, acoustic guitar, Chromaharp.
 Kirilo – vocals, electric bass, Casiotone, Roland SH-101.
 Fuzuki – vocals, drums, metal, tambourine, gong, kengari.
 Hoppy Kamiyama – piano, SH-101, Emu II, metal, voice, Scum Tape from the Garbage, gram pot.
 Tomoko Umino – trumpet (M-3, M-9).
 Kunio Koizumi – trombone (M-3, M-9).
 Takerou Sekijima – tuba (M-3, M-9).

Production
 Hoppy Kamiyama – record producer.
 Yoshiaki Kondo – recording at Gok Sounds, Tokyo, mastering at Kojima Recording.
 Yoshiaki Kondo and Hoppy Kamiyama – mixing at Gok Studios, Tokyo (November 27, 28, 30, December 1, 1998).
 Kazvnori Akita – design.
 Jimmy Henda – photography.
 Keita Ikeda – photography.
 Hirohiko Nogami – photography.
 eX-Girl – illustration.
 Ayumi – translation.
 Noami Hamada (Isyoya) – costumes.
 Makoto Suzuki, Ryuji Kusakawa, Toko Ueno – label staff.

EX-Girl albums
1999 albums